Adam of Dryburgh ( 1140 –  1212), in later times also known as Adam the Carthusian, Adam Anglicus and Adam Scotus, was an Anglo-Scottish theologian, writer and Premonstratensian and Carthusian monk.

Life
He was born around 1140 in the Anglo-Scottish border area (Northumberland & Scottish Borders) to parents whose names and identities are unknown. The details of his earliest education are not known. He is known to have rejected a clerical life in favour of monasticism, entering the Premonstratensian house of Dryburgh Abbey as a young man and becoming a priest there in 1165 at the age of twenty-five.

Adam served under the first two abbots, Roger and Gerard, before in 1184 Adam himself became abbot. It is not clear if Adam became a full abbot or if he was just acting abbot or coadjutor. Abbot Gerard may have become incapacitated by illness, and Adam apparently refused to be blessed by a bishop while Abbot Gerard still lived. Adam was summoned to Prémontré, France, by its abbot the head of Adam's order. While in France Adam visited the Carthusian priory of Val St Pierre, which impressed him so much that he himself vowed to become a Carthusian, resigning his abbacy at Dryburgh. In this, he was following in the footsteps of Abbot Roger, the first head of Dryburgh Abbey, who had retired to Val St Pierre in 1177.

Adam returned to Britain and visited Hugh of Lincoln, Bishop of Lincoln. After consulting with this senior Carthusian figure and future saint, Adam joined Hugh's old priory at Witham, Somerset. The Premonstratensians did not give up trying to get him back, however, and it was only after the intervention from Bishop Hugh that a letter of release was issued to Adam.  Adam would remain at Witham until his death, perhaps in the year 1212. He had no children, was said to have been of medium height; he was noted for his cheerfulness, his skill as a preacher and his good memory.

Works
Adam was also a prolific writer, which included many sermons as well as theological and other religious texts. Among his most famous works were:
 De tripartito tabernaculo, written at Dryburgh in 1180,
 Liber de quadripartito exercitio cellae (The fourfold exercise of the cell), written at Witham in about 1190. Until the early 20th century the work was generally wrongly attributed to Guigo II.
 Liber de ordine, habitu et professione canonicorum ordinis Praemonstratensis
 Over 60 sermons also survive
His writings were first published by Aegidius Gourmont in Paris in 1518, though there is still no modern scholarly edition of his works.

In the mid-sixteenth century, the churchman John Bale theorised the existence of a separate theologian called Adam the Carthusian, who Bale believed flourished around 1340; Bale attributed six works to that writer. It is now acknowledged, however, that this distinct Adam the Carthusian never existed, and that all these works were written by others.

See also
 Abbot of Dryburgh
 Dryburgh Abbey
 Witham Friary

Notes

References
 Bartlett, Robert, England under the Norman and Angevan Kings, 1075—1225Oxford University Press, 2000, p. 433
 Beckett, W. N. M., "Adam the Carthusian (supp. fl. 1340)", in Oxford Dictionary of National Biography, Oxford University Press, 2004 accessed 7 Feb 2007
 Bulloch, James, Adam of Dryburgh, (London: SPCK, 1958)
 Holdsworth, Christopher, "Dryburgh, Adam of (c.1140–1212?)", in Oxford Dictionary of National Biography, Oxford University Press, 2004 accessed 7 Feb 2007
 Watt, D. E. R. & Shead, N. F. (eds.), The Heads of Religious Houses in Scotland from the 12th to the 16th Centuries, The Scottish Records Society, New Series, Volume 24, (Edinburgh, 2001), p. 58–62

External links
 

1140s births
1212 deaths
Carthusians
English abbots
12th-century English Roman Catholic theologians
13th-century English Roman Catholic theologians
12th-century Latin writers
13th-century Latin writers
Premonstratensians
Scottish abbots
Medieval Scottish theologians
12th-century Scottish Roman Catholic clergy
12th-century Christian monks
13th-century Scottish Roman Catholic priests
13th-century Christian monks
12th-century Scottish writers
13th-century Scottish writers